Properigea mephisto is a species of cutworm or dart moth in the family Noctuidae. It is found in North America, where it has been recorded from Texas, Arizona, Massachusetts, New Mexico, Ontario and Wisconsin.

The MONA or Hodges number for Properigea mephisto is 9591.

References

Further reading

External links

 

Xylenini
Moths described in 1968